The McChord Air Museum is an aviation museum located at McChord Field near Lakewood, Washington. The museum is broken up into three separate areas: the main gallery, located at the south end of McChord Field in Building 517; the Heritage Hill Airpark, which overlooks the McChord Field runway; and the aircraft restoration and maintenance facility in Building 301.

History 
Plans for a museum began around 1982, when the McChord Air Museum Foundation was established. By mid-1983, a B-18 had been transported to the museum, an F-106 at the base was expected to join the collection, and negiotiations were ongoing regarding the acquisition of a C-124. The museum opened to the public the following year in the  Building 192.

Over a decade after the last aircraft left service, a C-124 was flown to the museum on 9 October 1986. The museum began moving to a larger building in 1989.

The C-124, along with a C-141, was moved to the newly established Heritage Park overlooking McCord Field's runway on 5 January 2005. An F-16 that responded to the September 11th attacks was planned to go on display at the museum in 2006, but shortly before it arrived the location was changed to the Western Air Defense Sector headquarters building.

Exhibits 

Exhibits at the museum include the former control tower of McChord Field, an F-106 simulator, and aviation artwork.

Collection 

 Beech UC-45J Expeditor
 Consolidated OA-10A Catalina
 Convair F-102A Delta Dagger
 Convair F-106A Delta Dart
 Douglas B-18A Bolo
 Douglas B-23 Dragon
 Douglas C-124C Globemaster II
 Douglas TC-47D Skytrain
 Fairchild C-82A Packet
 Fairchild Republic A-10A Thunderbolt II
 Kaman HH-43A Huskie
 Lockheed C-130E Hercules
 Lockheed C-141B Starlifter
 Lockheed T-33
 McDonnell CF-101F Voodoo
 McDonnell Douglas F-15A Eagle
 North American F-86D Sabre
 Sikorsky H-19 Chickasaw

See also 
 Malmstrom Museum

References

External links 

 

1984 establishments in Washington (state)
Air force museums in the United States
Aerospace museums in Washington (state)
Military and war museums in Washington (state)
Museums established in 1984
Museums in Pierce County, Washington
Joint Base Lewis–McChord